The Ford 999 was a nameplate attached to two distinct but similar racers built by Henry Ford during the early 20th century. Though they began as separate entities, they were virtually mechanically identical, and parts (and ultimately names) were swapped between them as needed, making the identities and legacies inseparable.

Creation
Henry Ford had an early interest in racing cars, having built and driven "Sweepstakes", a  model that won a race against Alexander Winton and other challengers in 1901. It was from the proceeds of this race that Ford created the Henry Ford Company. In March 1902, Ford left this original company over disputes with his stockholders and Henry Leland, taking with him $900 and schematics for a planned racer.  In Ford's absence, Leland took over the company, and made it into the Cadillac Motor Company later in 1902.

Henry Ford collaborated with bicycle racer Tom Cooper and a team of several assistants to create two similar racing cars that were as yet unnamed. They were painted red and yellow, respectively. The result was a huge engine with a bare chassis attached to it, with no bodywork whatsoever. There was no rear suspension, no differential, and steering was controlled by a crude pivoting metal bar, similar to a straight handlebar on a mountain bicycle, but with upright handgrips at the ends to operate it. The total cost of the project was $5000.

Though Ford's name was attached to the cars and the ensuing legend, he had sold his stake in them for $800 to Barney Oldfield and Cooper when the cars had refused to start during a test drive two weeks before the first race. Ultimately, Ford abandoned his share of the racing money, but reserved the right to promotions and publicity of the cars, which secured his image behind their eventual successes. He meanwhile built up the Ford Motor Company, which surpassed Winton in terms of production by the end of 1903.

In summer of 1902, Cooper and Oldfield carried out further work and got the red one working. The red one was named 999 for the Empire State Express No. 999. The yellow one was named Arrow for the connotations of a sleek arrow flying through the air.**

Racing career
Oldfield, despite having absolutely no driving experience, learned how to race the 999. In his October 1902 debut, a five-mile (8 km) race known as the Manufacturers' Challenge Cup, despite a strong challenge from Winton once again (which was the rematch for which Ford had originally planned), Oldfield easily won. The 999 set a course speed record at the track at Grosse Pointe, and went on to tour America and score many other victories.  Cooper retained ownership of the car for its racing career, while Oldfield ultimately pursued a racing career with Winton, against whom he had raced at the outset.

Icy speed record
Arrow also had a successful racing career, but its most famous incident was to come. It was crashed in September 1903 during a race, killing the driver Frank Day.  However, Henry Ford bought back the broken car and repaired it with the intent of performing a speed run on a frozen lake.  He renamed it 999, as the original red car had been retired already, and the press referred to it as the "new 999," "Red Devil," or a combination of the two.

On January 12, 1904 in New Baltimore, Michigan, Henry Ford personally drove the rechristened 999 with his mechanic Ed "Spider" Huff at the throttle. It stood for only a few weeks, but this was ample time to bring more good publicity for Ford's new company.

See also
 Land speed record

References

 Henry Ford and Racing
 Motorsports Hall of Fame of America- Ford 999
 Contemporary history of Ford
 Detailed replica of the 999
 Automobile Topics of Interest - October 5, 1902 7th segment includes a detailed description of the 999.

999
Wheel-driven land speed record cars
1900s cars
Motor vehicles manufactured in the United States